Abacetus hessei is a species of ground beetle in the subfamily Pterostichinae. It was found in the massive collection of Count Pierre François Marie Auguste Dejean in 1828, but it was not classified until 1940 by an Italian entomologist  Stefano Ludovico Straneo

References

hessei
Beetles described in 1940